The women's 4 × 100 metres relay event at the 1999 Summer Universiade was held on 12 and 13 July at the Estadio Son Moix in Palma de Mallorca, Spain.

Results

Heats

Final

References

Athletics at the 1999 Summer Universiade
1999 in women's athletics
1999